Sar Pushideh or Sarpushideh may refer to:
 Sar Pushideh, Bagh-e Malek
 Sar Pushideh, Izeh

See also
 Robat-e Sar Pushideh